Andrea Basili (Città della Pieve, 16 December 1705 – Loreto, 28 August 1777), was an Italian composer and music theorist. He was father of Francesco Basili.

His teacher was Tommaso Gaffi. He was maestro di capella at Cathedral of San Lorenzo Martire, Tivoli, then Basilica della Santa Casa.

Works 
Il martirio di Santa Sinforosa e dei sette santi suoi figliuoli nobili Tiburtini (oratorio, libretto di F. A. Lolli, 1737, Tivoli)
La Passione di Gesù Cristo (oratorio, 1743, Recanati)
Salmi con testo parafrasato in italiano
Christus factus est a 4 voci
Christus factus est a 5 voci
3 Miserere a 8 voci
Miserere a 10 voci
Missa breve a 4 voci
Beatus vir a 4 voci
Confitebor a 4 voci
Laetatus a 4 voci
Nisi dominus a 4 voci
Ave Maria a 4 voci
Iustorum animae a 5 voci
Kyrie e Gloria a 4 voci
Salve regina a 4 voci
Fuga in ottava tono plagale sopra l'antifono Veni Sponsa Christi (1740)
Litanie a 3 voci
Miserere double choir a 8 voci
Another 150 sacred works

References

1705 births
1777 deaths
18th-century Italian composers
18th-century composers
18th-century Italian male musicians
Italian male composers